Kisoro is a town in the Western Region of Uganda. It is the chief town of Kisoro District and the site of the district headquarters.

Location
Kisoro is east of Rumangabo and the Virunga Mountains in the Democratic Republic of the Congo (DRC). The geographical coordinates of Kisoro are 1°17'06.0"S, 29°41'06.0"E (Latitude:-1.2850; Longitude:29.6850).

Overview
Kisoro is located under the peaks of the Mufumbiro Mountains, which are part of the Virunga Mountains and home to rare mountain gorillas. Mountain scenery, Lake Mutanda, colorful markets, and volcano trekking also are available for visitors to Kisoro. It is the nearest town to the Mgahinga Gorilla National Park and is an access town for those traveling to Rwanda or the DRC for gorilla tracking in the Volcanoes National Park or the Virunga National Park.

Population
The 2002 national census estimated the population of Kisoro at 11,330. The Uganda Bureau of Statistics (UBOS) estimated the population at 12,700 in 2010. In 2011, UBOS estimated the mid-year population at 12,900. In 2014, the national population census estimated the population at 17,561.

Points of interest
The following additional points of interest are located within the town limits or near its edges:

 offices of Kisoro Town Council
 Kisoro central market
 Kisoro Airport, administered by the Civil Aviation Authority of Uganda
 Kisoro District Hospital, a 160-bed public hospital administered by the Uganda Ministry of Health
 Bwindi Impenetrable National Park, for viewing mountain gorillas
 Voice of Muhabura a local radio station that broadcasts on 88.9 FM. The radio streams live at Vomuhabura Online in Rufumbira (a local dialect synonymous to Kinyarwanda), Rukiga, English and Swahili. It serves over 6 million people.

Photos
Photo of downtown Kisoro
Panoramic View of Kisoro Town
Another View of Kisoro

See also
Bunagana, Uganda
Kigezi
List of cities and towns in Uganda

References

External links
Google Map of Kisoro Town

 
Kigezi sub-region
Kisoro District
Populated places in Western Region, Uganda